Cevdet Sunay (10 February 1899 – 22 May 1982) was a Turkish politician and army officer, who served as the fifth President of Turkey from 1966 to 1973.

Early life and career 
Sunay was born in 1899 in Trabzon, in the Ottoman Empire. After attending elementary school and middle school in Erzurum and Edirne, he graduated from Kuleli Military High School in Istanbul. During World War I, he fought in 1917 at the Palestine front and became a prisoner of war of the British in Egypt in 1918. After his release, he fought first on the southern front, then on the western front during the Turkish War of Independence.

Sunay completed his military education in 1927, and graduated from the staff college in 1930 as a staff officer. Rising through the ranks to become a general in 1949 and then a four-star general in 1959, he held important military posts. In 1960, he was appointed army chief and later joint chief of staff. On 14 March 1966, he was appointed to the senate by Cemal Gürsel under his presidential contingency.

When Gürsel's presidency was terminated due to ill health in accordance with the constitution, Cevdet Sunay was elected 5th president by the Grand National Assembly of Turkey on 28 March 1966. He maintained his office despite increasing terrorist activity, student riots, and threatened coups. He served the constitutional term of seven years until 28 March 1973 and became then a permanent senator.

He was married to Atıfet in 1929. They had three children.

Presidency 

Chief of the General Staff Cevdet Sunay was elected as the fifth president of the Turkish Republic by the Grand National Assembly of Turkey on 28 March 1966. His presidential service continued until 28 March 1973 where he had to go through troubled times. Between 1961 and 1965 Süleyman Demirel, Nihat Erim and Ferit Melen were the most prominent members in President Sunay’s administration. Cevdet Sunay resigned as president due to deteriorating health conditions.

Death 
Cevdet Sunay died of a heart attack on 22 May 1982 in Istanbul. His body was moved in August 1988 to a permanent burial place in the newly built Turkish State Cemetery in Ankara.

Honours 
National honours
  : Recipient of the Medal of Independence with Red Ribbon.
Foreign honours
  Empire of Iran : Commemorative Medal of the 2500th Anniversary of the founding of the Persian Empire (14/10/1971).
  : Knight Commander of the Order of the Bath [KCB].

See also
1962 attempted coup in Turkey

References

External links
Ministry of Foreign Affairs, Turkey
Presidency of Turkey

1899 births
1982 deaths
20th-century presidents of Turkey
People from Çaykara
Kuleli Military High School alumni
Ottoman Military Academy alumni
Ottoman Army officers
Ottoman military personnel of World War I
Ottoman prisoners of war
World War I prisoners of war held by the United Kingdom
Turkish military personnel of the Greco-Turkish War (1919–1922)
Recipients of the Medal of Independence with Red Ribbon (Turkey)
Army War College (Turkey) alumni
Turkish Army generals
Turkish Muslims
Deputy Chiefs of the Turkish General Staff
Commanders of the Turkish Land Forces
Chiefs of the Turkish General Staff
Presidents of Turkey
Honorary Knights Commander of the Order of the Bath
Burials at Turkish State Cemetery
Members of the Senate of the Republic (Turkey)